Area code 254 is a telephone area code serving the Waco/Temple/Killeen area in the U.S. state of Texas. It was created May 25, 1997, in a split from area code 817.

Ten-digit dialing
Prior to October 2021, area code 254 had telephone numbers assigned for the central office code 988. In 2020, 988 was designated nationwide as a dialing code for the National Suicide Prevention Lifeline, which created a conflict for exchanges that permit seven-digit dialing. This area code was therefore scheduled to transition to ten-digit dialing by October 24, 2021.

Coverage
The counties served by this area code include:

 Bell County
 Bosque County
 Callahan County
 Comanche County
 Coryell County 
 Eastland County 
 Erath County 
 Falls County 
 Freestone County
 Hamilton County 
 Hill County
 Hood County 
 Limestone County
 McLennan County 
 Milam County 
 Navarro County
 Robertson County
 Somervell County 
 Stephens County
 Williamson County

Popular culture
The area code 254 is the theme of local rappers in Welcome to 254. The rap, uploaded to YouTube on August 4, 2008, has received over 150,000 views as of March 2014.

See also
List of Texas area codes

References

External links

List of exchanges from AreaCodeDownload.com, 254 Area Code

Telecommunications-related introductions in 1997
254
254
McLennan County, Texas